The Kansas City and Olathe Electric Railway was a  electric interurban rail line between Kansas City, Missouri, and Olathe, Kansas, that operated between 1903 and 1934.

It was also known as the Kansas City, Lawrence and Topeka Railway (because it originally was supposed to go to those cities), the Hocker's Grove Line for developer Richard W. Hocker (it now is usually referred to as the Hocker Line) and the Kansas City, Merriam and Shawnee Line (it was to stir development in Merriam and Shawnee, Kansas).

See also
List of interurbans

External links
Kansas City, Kansas Public Library History
A Splendid Ride: The Streetcars of Kansas City, 1870-1957

Kansas City interurban railways
Transportation in Johnson County, Kansas
Transportation in Olathe, Kansas
Railway companies established in 1903
1934 disestablishments in Kansas
Defunct Kansas railroads
American companies established in 1903
1903 establishments in Kansas
American companies disestablished in 1934